Conscience of the Fatherland (abbreviated CONDEPA) was a populist political party in Bolivia in the late 20th century. The party was led by Carlos Palenque.

Goals
CONDEPA was founded in Tiwanaku on September 21, 1988. The party was primarily based in the La Paz Department.

CONDEPA was the first major party in Bolivia that appealed to the cultural identity of the Aymaras, the indigenous majority of the country. It borrowed katarista symbols and used the wiphala flag. Palenque often used references to Aymara culture in his campaigns.

Election history
The party won strong support amongst urban poor, amongst Aymaras that had migrated to the urban centres.

CONDEPA lost the mayoral post of La Paz in 1995.

At the time of the 1999 elections the CONDEPA was a party in crisis. It was discredited by having entered into Hugo Banzer's government. The party had suffered the death of its leader Carlos Palenque, and divisions had erupted amongst his successors. Moreover, the influence of the mass media connected to the party had decreased significantly. As the party lost the municipal contest in El Alto in these elections, it lost its last remaining political stronghold in the country.

Ahead of the 2002 general election, CONDEPA launched Nicolás Valdivia as its presidential candidate and Esperanza Huanca as vice-presidential candidate. CONDEPA lost all of its 22 seats in the Congress of Bolivia in the elections. The implosion of CONDEPA enabled the nascent Movement for Socialism to gain a wide following amongst indigenous urban poor. CONDEPA-Patriotic Movement lost its registration at the National Electoral Court shortly after the 2002 election.

References

Defunct political parties in Bolivia
Political parties established in 1988
1988 establishments in Bolivia
Political parties disestablished in 2002
2002 disestablishments in Bolivia